The Human Rights Tulip is an annual prize awarded by the Dutch ministry of Foreign Affairs to a human rights defender or organisation who promotes and supports human rights in innovative ways. The Human Rights Tulip was established in 2007 and presented for the first time on 10 December 2008 and designed by the artist duo Adelheid and Huub Kortekaas.

The prize consists of a statuette and support worth €100.000 to assist the winning individual or organization to further develop and scale up their innovation.

The procedure of awarding the Human Rights Tulip starts with an open nominating procedure. The winner is selected by the Dutch minister of Foreign Affairs on the basis of public voting and the advice of an independent jury.

In October 2013, The Netherlands Foreign Minister Frans Timmermans decided to retain the award but to seek greater awareness for it.

In June 2014, the foreign ministry appointed the international development organisation Hivos to run the selection process for the award. This partnership continued in 2015, when the shortlist of six candidates was composed of three gaining the most votes in a public voting process, and three more selected by the Foreign Ministry and Hivos.

Award winners
The 2008 prize winner  was Justine Masika Bihamba from Goma in North Kivu province in the Democratic Republic of Congo. Her organisation, Women's Synergy for the Victims of Sexual Violence (Synergie des femmes pour les Victimes des violences Sexuelles – SFVS) has since 2002 been fighting the massive use of sexual violence in the armed conflict in the east of the DRC.

The 2009 prize winner was Shadi Sadr from Tehran, Iran, a women's rights activist and campaigner against stoning as an execution method.

The 2010 prize winner was Bertha Oliva from Honduras, for her long struggle for the rights of relatives of people who were disappeared in Honduras between 1979 and 1989.

The 2011 prize winner was Ni Yulan, a human rights lawyer from China.

The 2012 prize winner was Marimuthu Bharathan, a Dalit human rights defender from India, although he could not receive the award in person due to his being denied a passport by the Government of India.

The 2013 prize winner was Aahung, a human rights organization from Pakistan working to further sexual and reproductive health and rights.

The 2014 prize winner was Mideast Youth, which creates online platforms for discussion of human rights issues in parts of the Middle East. The award was presented to Esra'a Al Shafei, the organisation's founder and director.

The 2015 prize went to IRA-Mauritania, an organisation challenging slavery in Mauritania.

The 2016 prize went to Nighat Dad, a Pakistani activist who supports the right of women to access the internet and use it free of harassment.

The 2017 prize went to Graciela Pérez Rodriguez, a Mexican human rights activist, who defends the rights of family members of disappeared persons in Mexico.

The 2018 prize went to the United Nations High Commissioner for Human Rights Zeid Ra'ad Al Hussein.

The 2020 prize went to the Armenian transgender activist and founder of Right Side NGO (Իրավունքի Կողմ), Lilit Martirosyan.

The 2021 prize went to the Ugandan human rights lawyer Nicholas Opiyo for his work against the anti-gay law in his country and the criminalising of torture.

Nominees

2014
In 2014, 30 candidates have been nominated for the prize:
Ladislaus Kiiza Rwakafuuzi, Elena Klimova, Audrey Mbugua, Meng Lin, Mideast Youth platform, Chidi Odinkalu, Sahil, Sima Samar, SHEILD, Terre des hommes, Under The Same Sun, WADI, YASunidos, Leyla Yunus, Margarita Zamora Tobar, Abounaddara, ASL19, CADHAC, Cairo Institute for Human Rights Studies, Centre for Civil Society and Democracy in Syria, Colectiva Feminista para el Desarallo Local, Committee Against Torture, Mazen Darwish, Droit et Justice, Euromaidan SOS, Foro de Jovenes con Liderazgo, Hasht-e Subh, International Campaign for Human Rights in Iran, Rasul Jafarov, and Jan Sahas.

2020
In 2020, 13 candidates have been nominated for the prize:
Lilit Martirosyan (Europe), The Belarus Helsinki Committee (Europe), Human Rights Centre ZMINA (Europe), Victor Domingo Zambrano Gonzales (Latin America), Georgina Orellano (Latin America), Carlos Fernando Charmorro Barrios (Latin America), 
Francisco José de Roux Rengifo (Latin America), zk´at Red de Sanadoras del Feminismo Comunitario Territorial (Latin America), Parveena Ahangar (Asia),
Quanzhang Wang and Wenzu Li (Asia), the Egyptian Commission for Rights and Freedoms (Middle East and North Africa), the Palestinian Working Woman Society for Development (Middle East and North Africa), and the Sudanese Professionals Association (Sub-Saharan Africa).

References

External links

 Human Rights Tulip, Netherlands Government webpage
 Human Rights Tulip, Innovating Justice Forum
 Human Rights Tulip, HiiL
 Photograph of the Tulip statuette (Aahung website)

Human rights awards
Awards established in 2007
2007 establishments in the Netherlands